Latchmie Kumarie Vainmati Kallicharran (5 June 1951 – 20 January 2002) was a Guyanese writer. She was one of the pioneers of Indo-Guyanese cultural awareness. 

She also organized and presented cultural programmes, the first being Lalla-Rookh. She staged her first show in the early 1970s when there was considerable resistance within the ruling PNC to regard Indo-Guyanese culture as being truly Guyanese. She organized dance and music shows, working to incorporate Chutney music into Mashramani, as well as the organization of an important photographic exhibition of Indo-Guyanese history and artifacts.

Kallicharan grew up in Berbice, Guyana and attended the Berbice Educational Institute before attending University of Guyana, where she also worked as a librarian. She died in a fire in early 2002.

She was posthumously awarded IAC honors by the Indian Action Committee.

Works 

 1986 Shraadanjali anthology of Indo-Guyanese poetry
 1996 They Came in Ships: An Anthology of Indo-Guyanese Prose and Poetry Lloyd Searwar, Joel Benjamin, Ian McDonald, Lakshmi Kallicharan

References

1951 births
2002 deaths
Guyanese women writers
Deaths from fire
20th-century women writers
20th-century Guyanese writers
 

Indo-Guyanese people